The DC Palestinian Film and Arts Festival (DCPFAF) is a non-profit, volunteer-run annual film festival established in 2011 that showcases the work of Palestinian filmmakers and artists in Palestine and in diaspora, showcasing the range and complexity of Palestinian identities and narratives. The DCPFAF aims to bring together Washington, DC's various communities through art, catalyzing conversations about film, culture, and diaspora, utilizing the lens of Palestinian filmmakers as an entry point.

Background
In 2011, a group of three dedicated young women founded the DCPFAF to create a platform for the artistic creativity of Palestinians, primarily through film but also through visual art, music, and other mediums. The stories shared in the DCPFAF are not necessarily about Palestine in relation to Israeli occupation, nor are they stories necessarily about Palestinians. The aim of the DCPFAF is to reflect the dynamic formation of a transnational identity common to Palestinians and diasporic communities in general.

The DCPFAF launched in September 2011 after a successful two-day teaser festival that May. The DCPFAF, an entirely volunteer-run project, is incorporated in the District of Columbia as a non-governmental organization and a registered 501(c)3 entity.

2015 DCPFAF Program
 The Wanted 18, by Amer Shomali and Paul Cowan
 My Love Awaits Me by the Sea, by Mais Darwazah
 Giraffada, by Rani Massalha
 Hamule, by Mauricio Misle
 Roshmia, by Salim Abu Jabal
 Pioneer High, by Suha Araj
 Nun wa Zaytun, by Emtiaz Diab
 The Living of the Pigeons, by Baha' AbuShanab
 Villa Touma, by Suha Arraf
 Mars at Sunrise, by Jessica Habie
 The Book of Disappearance: Arabic Literary Program with Ibtisam Azem
 Layering Identities: From Architectural Heritage to Writing with Suad Amiry
 Musical performance by Rahim AlHaj and the Wanees Zarour Ensemble
 Photojournalism in Gaza with Eman Mohammed

2014 DCPFAF Program
 Condom Lead, Tarzan and Arab
 Gaza 36mm, by Khalil Al Mozayen
 A World Not Ours, by Mahdi Fleifel
 Cinema Palestine, by Tim Schwab and Majdi El-Omari
 Where Should the Birds Fly, by Fida Qishta
 Omar, by Hany Abu-Assad
 May in the Summer, by Cherien Dabis
 Horizon, by Zain Duraie
 Yalla to the Moon, by Jacqueline Reem Salloum and Suhell Nafar
 Leaving Oslo, by Yazan Khalili 
 From Ramallah, by Assem Nasser
 Message to Obama, by Muhannad Salahat
 Journey of a Sofa, by Alaa Al Ali 
 Apartment 10/14, by Tarzan and Arab
 Interference, by Amin Nayfeh
 Oslo Syndrome, by Ayman Azraq
 Twenty Handshakes for Peace, by Mahdi  Fleifel
 Long War, by Asma Ghanem
 The Huda Asfour Quartet
 Lena Seikaly and Trio
 Stories for Justice, Visualizing Palestine exhibit

2013 DCPFAF Program
 When I Saw You, by Annemarie Jacir
 Where Should the Birds Fly? by Fida Qishta
 When Monaliza Smiled, by Fadi Haddad
 Infiltrators, by Khaled Jarrar
 Lyrics Revolt with Shannon Farhoud, Ahlene Ramadan, Melanie Fridgant, Rana Khaled Al Khatib

2012 DCPFAF Program
 The Last Friday 
 Man Without a Cell Phone
 Nukayba
 Gaza: Tunnels to Nowhere
 Uncle Nashaat
 Palestinian Innovators: Love Under Apartheid with Tanya Keilani, Mousa Kraish, and Huda Asfour
 Yousef Erakat of FouseyTube

2011 DCPFAF Program
This is My Picture When I Was Dead, by Mahmoud Al Massad
Kingdom of Women, by Dahna Abourahme
 From Palestine With Love, by Mahasen Nasser-Eldin
 Samia, by Mahasen Nasser-Eldin
The Time That Remains, by Elia Suleiman
Diaries, by May Odeh
Yousef Erakat of FouseyTube
Mustafa Staiti of the Freedom Theatre

Further reading
Gaul, Anny and Nour Joudah. "Film and its Voices: The DC Palestinian Film and Arts Festival." Jadaliyya, October 8, 2011.

See also

Boston Palestine Film Festival
Chicago Palestine Film Festival
Cinema of Palestine
List of Palestinian films
List of film festivals

Notes

External links 
 Official Website
 Official Facebook Page
Official Twitter
Official YouTube

Arab-American culture in Washington, D.C.
Palestinian-American culture
Cinema of the State of Palestine
Arabic-language films
Film festivals in Washington, D.C.
Asian-American film festivals
Film festivals established in 2011